The Appalachian State–Marshall football rivalry, known colloquially as The Old Mountain Feud, is a college rivalry between the Mountaineers of Appalachian State University in Boone, North Carolina, and the Thundering Herd of Marshall University in Huntington, West Virginia. The rivalry is significant for the competitiveness of the contests, as well as its place in contemporary Appalachian culture. Both campuses residing in the Appalachian Mountains, the two public universities both were once teacher's academies.

The football programs were dominant during their time in the Division I Football Championship Subdivision (FCS). From 1986-1996 the Southern Conference foes won at least a share of the conference title a combined eight times (Marshall ended the 1988 season tied with Furman for first). Nationally, the teams have combined for three Walter Payton Awards and five national championships. Marshall transitioned to the Football Bowl Subdivision (FBS) in 1997. Appalachian State moved to the FBS in 2014. Both programs continued to enjoy on-field success after their respective conference changes.

Appalachian State leads the all-time series, 15–10. The rivalry was played annually 1977–1996. The rivalry resumed annual play in the 2020 season and is set to continue as Marshall joined Appalachian State in the Sun Belt Conference East Division in 2022.

History 
Marshall's football program began in 1895 and the program at Appalachian State began in 1928. However, the Thundering Herd and Mountaineers did not meet until Marshall joined the Southern Conference in 1977. The teams were both in contention for Southern Conference titles during the seasons, and in the offseason the coaches would vie for the same regional recruits. In 1995, the fervor was so intense that the Marshall fans attacked the Appalachian State team bus on its way to Joan C. Edwards Stadium.

Marshall would leave the conference in 1996, rendering the rivalry dormant until 2020, save for one game in 2002. In the time, both football programs gained national recognition uncommon to many FCS and Group of Five teams. Appalachian State became the first FCS school to beat an AP top-5 program when they bested Michigan in 2007, and became the first college football program to win a bowl game in its first year of eligibility. Marshall's Randy Moss would have a Hall of Fame NFL career and the program was the subject of the 2006 feature film We Are Marshall, based on the aftermath of the Southern Airways Flight 932 tragedy.

Though many Marshall fans consider Appalachian State to be their top rival, most Appalachian State fans consider Marshall their secondary rival behind longtime adversary Georgia Southern. Still, the rivalry remains fierce among coaches, players, and fans. An altercation at Kidd Brewer Stadium in 2021 made national news after a group of Mountaineer supporters taunted some Marshall players on their way to the locker room after the game, and in response a Marshall player spat at the fans. The incident was caught on video and prompted a media dialogue about acceptable behavior between spectators and student-athletes.

Game results

See also 

 List of NCAA college football rivalry games

References 

College football rivalries in the United States
Appalachian State Mountaineers football
Marshall Thundering Herd football